Maria Huybrechts (born 5 July 1930) is a Belgian former swimmer. She competed in the women's 4 × 100 metre freestyle relay at the 1948 Summer Olympics.

References

External links
 

1930 births
Possibly living people
Olympic swimmers of Belgium
Swimmers at the 1948 Summer Olympics
Swimmers from Antwerp
Belgian female freestyle swimmers